Northwest Territories territorial electoral districts are currently single member ridings that each elect one member to the Legislative Assembly of the Northwest Territories.

Current

Defunct 

 Banff (N.W.T. electoral district)
 Batoche (N.W.T. electoral district)
 Battleford (N.W.T. electoral district)
 Broadview (N.W.T. electoral district)
 Calgary (N.W.T. electoral district)
 Cardston (N.W.T. electoral district)
 Central Arctic
 Cumberland (N.W.T. electoral district)
 East Calgary (N.W.T. electoral district)
 Eastern Arctic
 Edmonton (N.W.T. electoral district)
 High River (N.W.T. electoral district)
 Hudson Bay (N.W.T. electoral district)
 Innisfail (N.W.T. electoral district)
 Inuvik (electoral district)
 Kinistino (N.W.T. electoral district)
 Lacombe (N.W.T. electoral district)
 Lethbridge (N.W.T. electoral district)
 Lorne (electoral district)
 Mackenzie North
 Mackenzie River (N.W.T. electoral district)
 Mackenzie South
 Mackenzie West
 Macleod (N.W.T. electoral district)
 Medicine Hat (N.W.T. electoral district)
 Moose Jaw (N.W.T. electoral district)
 Moose Mountain (N.W.T. electoral district)
 Moosomin (N.W.T. electoral district)
 Qu'Appelle (N.W.T. electoral district)
 Regina (N.W.T. electoral district)
 South Regina (N.W.T. electoral district)
 St. Albert (N.W.T. electoral district)
 Strathcona (N.W.T. electoral district)
 Tu Nedhe
 Victoria (N.W.T. electoral district)
 Weledeh
 West Calgary (N.W.T. electoral district)
 Wetaskiwin (N.W.T. electoral district)
 Whitewood (N.W.T. electoral district)
 Yellowknife (administrative district)
 Yorkton (N.W.T. electoral district)

References

See also 

Government of the Northwest Territories
Northwest Territories
Electoral districts